Vazneh is a village in Hasanlu Rural District, Mohammadyar District, Naqadeh County, West Azerbaijan Province, Iran. At the 2006 census, its population was 460, in 85 families.

The village is populated by Kurds.

References 

Populated places in Naqadeh County

Kurdish settlements in West Azerbaijan Province